KKPL (99.9 FM, 99.9 The Point) is a radio station broadcasting a hot adult contemporary format. Licensed to Laporte, Colorado, United States, the station is currently owned by Townsquare Media.

History
The station was assigned the calls KRRR on 1996-10-23. On 2002-02-08 the station became the current KKPL.

References

External links

KPL
Hot adult contemporary radio stations in the United States
Radio stations established in 1996
Townsquare Media radio stations